Wall Lake is an unincorporated community in Otter Tail County, in the U.S. state of Minnesota.

History
A post office was established at Wall Lake in 1870 and was discontinued in 1906. The community took its name from nearby Wall Lake.

References

Unincorporated communities in Otter Tail County, Minnesota
Unincorporated communities in Minnesota